Epiphaneia (foaled 11 February 2010) is a Japanese Thoroughbred racehorse. In 2012, he was unbeaten in three races including the Grade III Radio Nikkei Hai Nisai Stakes. In the following year, he finished second in both the Satsuki Sho and the Tokyo Yushun before winning the Kobe Shimbun Hai and the Kikuka Sho. He recorded his biggest success in 2014 when winning the Japan Cup.

Background
Epiphaneia is a bay horse with a white star bred in Japan by Northern Farm. He was sired by Symboli Kris S, an American-bred stallion who was twice voted Japanese Horse of the Year. At stud, he has sired several other major winners including Strong Return (Yasuda Kinen), Success Brocken (February Stakes) and Alfredo (Asahi Hai Futurity Stakes). Epiphaneia's dam Cesario was an outstanding racemare who won the Yushun Himba and the American Oaks and was voted the JRA Award for Best Three-Year-Old Filly in 2005. Her other foals have included Saturnalia and Leontes. As a descendant of The Oaks winner Pia, Cesario was related to other major winners, including Chief Singer and Pleasantly Perfect.

During his racing career, Epiphaneia was owned by U Carrott Farm and trained by Katsuhiko Sumii. He has been ridden in most of his races by Yuichi Fukunaga.

Racing career

2012: two-year-old season
Epiphaneia was undefeated in three starts as a two-year-old in 2012. He made his racecourse debut in a maiden race over 1800 metres at Kyoto Racecourse on 21 October and won from Red Giselle. At the same course in November, he won the Listed Kyoto Nisai Stakes over 2000 metres, beating Dantsu Atlas. In December, he was moved up in class for the Grade III Radio Nikkei Hai Nisai Stakes at Hanshin Racecourse. Starting the 0.9/1 favourite, he won by half a length from Bad Boy, with Kizuna a neck away in third.

2013: three-year-old season
Epiphaneia made his three-year-old debut in the Grade II Hochi Hai Yayoi Sho over 2000 metres at Nakayama Racecourse in which he was ridden for the first and only time by William Buick. He started the 1.3/1 favourite and finished fourth in a blanket finish behind Camino Tassajara, Miyaji Taiga, and Codino, with Kizuna in fifth. On 14 April, over the same course and distance, the colt started the 2.9/1 second favourite for the Grade I Satsuki Sho and finished second of the eighteen runners, beaten half a length by the favourite Logotype. Epiphaneia was then moved up in distance for the Tokyo Yushun over 2400 metres at Tokyo Racecourse on 26 May. Starting at odds of 5.1/1 in an eighteen runner-field he finished second again, beaten half a length by Kizuna, with Apollo Sonic, Peptide Amazon, and Logotype in third, fourth and fifth.

After the summer break, Epiphaneia returned in the Grade II Kobe Shimbun Hai (a trial race for the Kikuka Sho) over 2400 metres at Hanshin on 22 September. He started the 2/5 favourite against seventeen opponents and won by two and a half lengths from Majesty Hearts. At Kyoto on 20 October, Epiphaneia started 3/5 favourite for the Kikuka Sho over 3000 metres. He tracked the pace-setters Bande and Neko Taisho before taking the lead 400 metres from the finish and recorded his first Grade I success, beating Santono Noblesse by five lengths. After the race, Fukunaga told the Japan Times, "He ran a perfect race. He was so calm prior to the start that I was worried he might not leave the gate on time. But he started well, and we knew which two horses were going to set the pace so all I had to do was focus on settling him".

2014: four-year-old season
Epiphaneia began his third season in the Grade II Sankei Osaka Hai over 2000 metres at Hanshin on 6 April. He started the 9/10 favourite and finished third of the eight runners behind Kizuna and Tokai Paradise. Later that month, the colt represented Japan in the Queen Elizabeth II Cup at Sha Tin Racecourse in Hong Kong. Starting at odds of 11/5, he finished fourth behind Designs On Rome, Military Attack and the South African challenger Vercingetorix.

On his first appearance of his autumn campaign, Epiphaneia contested the Tenno Sho over 2000 metres at Tokyo and finished sixth of the eighteen runners behind the five-year-old Spielberg. Christophe Soumillon took over the ride from Fukunaga when Epihaneia contested the 33rd running of the Japan Cup over 2400 metres in front of a crowd of 100,186 at Tokyo on 30 November. He started at odds of 7.9/1 in a field which included Trading Leather from Ireland, Ivanhowe from Germany, and Up With The Birds from Canada. The locally trained runners included Gentildonna, who was attempting to win the race for an unprecedented third time, Just A Way, Harp Star, and Spielberg. Epiphaneia tracked the leader, Satono Shuren, before taking the lead 400 metres from the finish. He accelerated clear in the closing stages to win by four lengths in a time of 2:23.1 from Just A Way with Spielberg half a length away in third ahead of Gentildonna, Harp Star, and Ivanhowe. After the race, Soumillon said, "The horse was very keen and I can't say I was very confident when I saw how he started because I saw I wouldn't be able to ride him the way the trainer asked: in sixth or seventh position... [it was] an amazing performance". The Arima Kinen over 2500 metres at Nakayama Racecourse on 28 December attracted its customary strong field, and Epiphaneia started second in the betting behind Gold Ship, with the other contenders including Just A Way and Gentildonna. Epiphaneia tracked the early leader, Verxina, before taking the lead 400 metres from the finish but was outpaced in the closing stages and finished fifth behind Gentildonna, To The World, Gold Ship, and Just A Way in a blanket finish.

2015: five-year-old season
For his 2015 debut, Epiphaneia was sent to the United Arab Emirates to contest the Dubai World Cup in which he raced on dirt for the first time. He was never in contention, finishing last of the nine runners behind Prince Bishop. In late June, it was announced that the horse would face a lengthy absence from racing after sustaining a suspensory ligament injury. He did not return to the track and was retired from racing at the end of the year.

Assessment and awards
In 2012, Epiphaneia finished second to Logotype in the voting for the JRA Award for Best Two-Year-Old Colt In the following year, he finished runner-up to Kizuna in the poll for JRA Award for Best Three-Year-Old Colt, taking 38 of the 280 votes. In the 2013 edition of the 2013 World's Best Racehorse Rankings, Epiphaneia was rated the 83rd best racehorse in the world and the 20th best three-year-old colt.

In the 2014 JRA Awards, Epiphaneia finished third to Gentildonna and Just A Way in the poll for the Japanese Horse of the Year and runner-up to Just A Way in the voting for the Best Older Male Horse

In the 2014 World's Best Racehorse Rankings, Epiphaneia was rated the second-best horse to race anywhere in the world in 2014 behind Just A Way and the best in the Long-distance division.

Stud Record
Epiphaneia began his stud career in 2016 at the Shadai Stallion Station. He sired the first undefeated Japanese Triple Tiara Daring Tact in his first crop of foals and Efforia, who went on to beat Gran Alegria, Contrail and Chrono Genesis in Tenno Sho (Autumn) and Arima Kinen respectively as a 3-year old colt, in his second crop.  As of 2023 his stud service fee is ¥18,000,000.

Notable progeny

c = colt, f = filly, g = gelding

Pedigree

References

2010 racehorse births
Racehorses bred in Japan
Racehorses trained in Japan
Japan Cup winners
Thoroughbred family 16-a